Martha Irene Randall (born June 12, 1948) is an American former competition swimmer, Olympic medalist, and former world record-holder.

As a 16-year-old, Randall competed in the 1964 Summer Olympics held in Tokyo, Japan.  She received a bronze medal for her third-place performance in the 400-meter individual medley, finishing in 5:24.2.  The U.S. women's team swept the 400-meter event with Randall's fellow American teammates, Donna de Varona and Sharon Finneran, who finished first and second.

Randall helped set a new world-record time of 4:34.6 in the 4×100-meter medley relay as a member of a U.S. team that included Cathy Ferguson, Cynthia Goyette, and Kathy Ellis on September 28, 1964.  The record was broken twenty days later by another U.S. team at the 1964 Olympics.

See also
 List of Olympic medalists in swimming (women).
 World record progression 400 metres freestyle.
 World record progression 4 × 100 metres medley relay.

References

1948 births
Living people
American female medley swimmers
World record setters in swimming
Olympic bronze medalists for the United States in swimming
Swimmers from Chicago
Swimmers at the 1964 Summer Olympics
Medalists at the 1964 Summer Olympics
Universiade medalists in swimming
Universiade gold medalists for the United States
Universiade bronze medalists for the United States
Medalists at the 1967 Summer Universiade
20th-century American women